Trufanovo is a rural locality (a village) in Semyonkovskoye Settlement, Vologodsky District, Vologda Oblast, Russia. The population was 11 as of 2002.

Geography 
Trufanovo is located 10 km north of Vologda (the district's administrative centre) by road. Borilovo is the nearest rural locality.

References 

Rural localities in Vologodsky District